Sir Stanley Ford Rous  (25 April 1895 – 18 July 1986) was an English football referee and the 6th President of FIFA, serving from 1961 to 1974. He also served as secretary of the Football Association from 1934 to 1962 and was an international referee.

Early life
Rous was born in Mutford near Lowestoft in East Suffolk and attended Sir John Leman School in Beccles. He was the eldest son of a provision master but trained as a teacher in Beccles before serving in World War I as a non-commissioned officer in the 272nd brigade of the Royal Field Artillery (East Anglian) in France, Palestine, Egypt, and Lebanon.

After the war Rous attended St Luke's College in Exeter and then became a sports teacher at Watford Boys Grammar School.

Referee

Rous played football at amateur level as a goalkeeper for clubs including Kirkley and Lowestoft Town, but was forced to retire from playing after breaking a wrist. He developed an interest in refereeing whilst watching Norwich City and later qualified as a referee while studying at St Luke's and became a football league referee in 1927. He officiated in his first international match, a 2–0 friendly win for Belgium against the Netherlands, in the Bosuilstadion, Antwerp, on 13 March in the same year. He eventually officiated in a total of 34 international matches.

He rose to the top tier of the game when he was appointed to referee the 1934 FA Cup Final at Wembley Stadium, where Manchester City defeated Portsmouth by 2 goals to 1. The following day, after travelling to Belgium to control an international match, Rous retired from refereeing.

Rous made a major contribution to the game by rewriting the Laws of the Game in 1938, making them simpler and easier to understand. He was also the first to employ the diagonal system of control for referees as a standard practice. According to Belgian referee John Langenus, who had been in charge of the 1930 FIFA World Cup Final, he had seen referees from his country making a similar attempt at scientific positioning on the field of play.

Administrator
Rous moved on to  the sphere of football administration. He served as secretary of the Football Association from 1934 to 1962. At UEFA, Rous joined the Executive Committee in 1958, becoming vice-president in March 1960, before leaving to become FIFA president the following year. During his time as FIFA president from 1961 to 1974, Rous witnessed the crowning of England as champions of the world in 1966.

Rous supported the apartheid-era South African Football Association. South Africa had been admitted to FIFA in 1954, but were expelled from their local federation, the Confederation of African Football (CAF), in 1958, and were suspended from FIFA in 1961 after failing to fulfill an ultimatum regarding anti-discrimination rules. In 1963, they were readmitted to FIFA after Rous travelled to the country to "investigate" football in the country, concluding that the game could disappear in the country if they were not readmitted, while the South African Football Association proposed playing an all-white team for the 1966 finals and an all-black team in 1970. It turned out to be short-lived. At FIFA's next annual congress, held in Tokyo just after the Olympic Games, a greater turnout of African and Asian representatives led to South Africa being suspended again, and they were ultimately expelled from FIFA in 1976.

Rous, however, continued to press for them to be readmitted, to the point that he was prepared to establish a Southern African confederation so that South Africa and Rhodesia (who were themselves expelled in 1970) could compete, but he was forced to back down after CAF members made it clear that they would withdraw en masse from FIFA at the 1966 FIFA congress in London.

Rous stood for re-election as president in 1974, but was defeated by the vigorous canvassing of João Havelange, and in the context of discontent of other nations at European domination of FIFA, as well as opposition by African and Asian countries due to the pro-South African stance of Rous. Upon his retirement as president, on 11 June 1974, he was nominated Honorary President of FIFA.

The short-lived Rous Cup was named after him, as was the Rous Stand at Watford F.C.'s Vicarage Road ground, until being renamed the Graham Taylor Stand in 2014. He wrote A History of the Laws of Association Football, published in 1974.

Personal life
Stanley Rous was married to Adrienne Gacon in 1924. He was appointed CBE in 1943 and knighted in 1949. He was a lifelong friend of one of the founding members of FIFA, Dr. Ivo Schricker (1877–1962). Rous was an active freemason attending Exonian Lodge No. 3415 in London.

Death
Rous died in Paddington, London, of leukaemia in 1986, at the age of 91. A service in his memory was held at Westminster Abbey in the September of the same year.

He is buried with his wife Lady Rous in the Holy Trinity Church in the Lickey Hills, close to both Bromsgrove and Birmingham.

References

Further reading 
Football Worlds: A Lifetime in Sport, Stanley Rous (Faber and Faber 1978), .

1895 births
1986 deaths
Military personnel from Suffolk
Burials in West Midlands (region)
People from Waveney District
English footballers
Association football goalkeepers
Kirkley & Pakefield F.C. players
Lowestoft Town F.C. players
FA Cup Final referees
Presidents of FIFA
Association football people awarded knighthoods
Knights Bachelor
Watford F.C. directors
Commanders of the Order of the British Empire
Royal Field Artillery soldiers
British Army personnel of World War I
Members of Paddington Metropolitan Borough Council
Deaths from cancer in England
Deaths from leukemia
Soccer and apartheid
Freemasons of the United Grand Lodge of England